Cristóvão Segunda Palanga Simão best known as Ndulo (born June 1, 1996) is an Angolan footballer who plays as a goalkeeper for Desportivo da Huíla in the Angolan league, the Girabola.

References

External links 
 

1996 births
Living people
Association football goalkeepers
Angolan footballers
Angola international footballers
Académica Petróleos do Lobito players
C.D. Huíla players
Footballers from Luanda
2019 Africa Cup of Nations players